Rivadavia Department may refer to several departments in Argentina:
 Rivadavia Department, Buenos Aires
 Rivadavia Department, Mendoza
 Rivadavia Department, Salta
 Rivadavia Department, San Juan
 Rivadavia Department, Santiago del Estero

See also
 Rivadavia

Department name disambiguation pages